Gabriella Gobbi is an Italo-Canadian psychiatrist and neuroscientist whose research explores novel treatments for mental health disorders. Gobbi is a professor at McGill University's Department of Psychiatry and a Canada Research Chair (Tier 1) in Therapeutics for Mental Health.

Research career 
In 1991, Gobbi completed a Doctor of Medicine degree, and specialized in Psychiatry and Psychotherapy (1995) at the Catholic University of Rome in Italy and later obtained a PhD in neuroscience under the supervision of Gianluigi Gessa.

Scientific contributions

Psychedelics for anxiety 
Gobbi's research has shown that regular administration of low doses of LSD (lysergic acid diethylamide) reduces anxiety, through mechanisms similar commonly prescribed classes of antidepressants and selective serotonin reuptake inhibitors (SSRIs), and that LSD signaling also activates the mTOR signalling pathway.

Cannabis and association with depression in adolescence 
Dr. Gobbi’s lab discovered that adolescent cannabis consumption induces depression-like behavior in animals. Upon finding that there is a link between depression and long-term cannabis consumption in young people, Gobbi engaged widely with stakeholders and the media, ultimately resulting in a change in the legal age of cannabis consumption in Quebec from 18 to 21, and her receiving the 2020 Principal's Prize for Public Engagement through Media (Established Academics category) from McGill University.

Melatonin MT2 receptor agonists for pain and insomnia 
Even if melatonin was isolated more than 60 years ago, the roles of GPCR melatonin receptors (named MT1 and MT2) remained unknown. Her lab discovered that the MT1 and MT2 receptors have very specialized functions: while the MT1 activates REM sleep, the MT2 receptor acts on NREM sleep. Her lab also synthesized and developed novel selective MT2 receptors partial agonists for the treatment of insomnia and neuropathic pain.

Honors and Awards 
Dr Gobbi is a member of the American College of Neuropsychopharmacology.

 2022 Canadian College of Neuropsychopharmacology (CCNP), Innovation in Neuropsychopharmacology
 2022 International College of Neuropsychopharmacology (CINP) - Sumimoto/Sunovion Brain Health Basic Research Award
 2020 McGill Principal’s prize for public engagement through media
 2017 Dr. Samarthji Lal award for Mental Health Research, Graham Boeckh Foundation    
 2015 Premio Venezia - Italian Chamber of Commerce in Canada
 2014 American College Neuropsychopharmacology (ACNP), Associate Member
 2013 Gold Medal for Merit- City of Osimo (An), Italy
 2012 Canadian College of Neuropsychopharmacology (CCNP), Award for a young investigator
 2007 Canadian Psychiatric Research Foundation (CPRF), Award for a young investigator
 2006 Canadian Psychiatric Research Foundation (CPRF), Award for a young investigator
 1998 Award for young researcher, World Federation of Societies of Biological Psychiatry
 1998 Recipient of the Wyeth-Ayerst Canada Fellowship
 1996 Award for research in Adolescent Psychiatry and Psychotherapy, Pio Sodalizio dei Piceni  ,

Selected academic publications 

 Gobbi, G., Bambico, F. R., Mangieri, R., Bortolato, M., Campolongo, P., Solinas, M., ... & Piomelli, D. (2005). Antidepressant-like activity and modulation of brain monoaminergic transmission by blockade of anandamide hydrolysis. Proceedings of the National Academy of Sciences, 102(51), 18620-18625.
 Gobbi, G., Atkin, T., Zytynski, T., Wang, S., Askari, S., Boruff, J., ... & Mayo, N. (2019). Association of cannabis use in adolescence and risk of depression, anxiety, and suicidality in young adulthood: a systematic review and meta-analysis. JAMA psychiatry, 76(4), 426-434.
 Comai, S., & Gobbi, G. (2014). CCNP Award Paper: Unveiling the role of melatonin MT2 receptors in sleep, anxiety and other neuropsychiatric diseases: a novel target in psychopharmacology. Journal of Psychiatry and Neuroscience, 39(1), 6-21.
 Posa, Luca, Danilo De Gregorio, Gabriella Gobbi, and Stefano Comai. "Targeting melatonin MT2 receptors: a novel pharmacological avenue for inflammatory and neuropathic pain." Current medicinal chemistry 25, no. 32 (2018): 3866-3882.
 Lopez-Canul, M., Palazzo, E., Dominguez-Lopez, S., Luongo, L., Lacoste, B., Comai, S., ... & Gobbi, G. (2015). Selective melatonin MT2 receptor ligands relieve neuropathic pain through modulation of brainstem descending antinociceptive pathways. Pain, 156(2), 305-317.
 De Gregorio, D., Popic, J., Enns, J. P., Inserra, A., Skalecka, A., Markopoulos, A., ... & Gobbi, G. (2021). Lysergic acid diethylamide (LSD) promotes social behavior through mTORC1 in the excitatory neurotransmission. Proceedings of the National Academy of Sciences, 118(5), e2020705118.
 De Gregorio, D., Inserra, A., Enns, J. P., Markopoulos, A., Pileggi, M., El Rahimy, Y., ... & Gobbi, G. (2022). Repeated lysergic acid diethylamide (LSD) reverses stress-induced anxiety-like behavior, cortical synaptogenesis deficits and serotonergic neurotransmission decline. Neuropsychopharmacology, 47(6), 1188-1198.
 Aguilar-Valles, A., De Gregorio, D., Matta-Camacho, E., Eslamizade, M. J., Khlaifia, A., Skaleka, A., ... & Sonenberg, N. (2021). Antidepressant actions of ketamine engage cell-specific translation via eIF4E. Nature, 590(7845), 315-319.

References 

Canadian women scientists
Academic staff of McGill University
Canada Research Chairs
Year of birth missing (living people)
Living people